Hisham Marwah is a Syrian lawyer. He is the director of the legal office of the Syrian National Council.

References

Syrian nationalists
Syrian politicians
21st-century Syrian lawyers